The women's 4 × 5 kilometre relay cross-country skiing competition at the 2014 Sochi Olympics took place on 15 February at Laura Biathlon & Ski Complex. Sweden won the event. This became the first gold medal in the women's relay for Sweden since the 1960 Winter Olympics. Finland won the silver medals, and Germany finished third.

Gold medals won in this event featured a fragment from the Chelyabinsk meteor, to commemorate the first anniversary of the meteor strike.

Results
The race was started at 14:00.

In November 2017, Yuliya Ivanova was disqualified from the event meaning that the whole Russian team was also disqualified. In September 2018, Marina Piller was disqualified for doping, and all her 2014 Olympic results were annulled, including the result of the Italian relay team.

Flower and medal ceremonies 
Immediately after the race a flower ceremony was held at the ski stadium, where the medalist received flowers on the podium. The next day the medal ceremony was held in Sochi, where the gold medals was handed out by International Olympic Committee member Gunilla Lindberg and flowers handed out by International Ski Federation Cross-Country Committee chairman Vegard Ulvang, after which the Swedish national anthem was played for the gold medal team on the podium.

References

Women's cross-country skiing at the 2014 Winter Olympics
Women's 4 × 5 kilometre relay cross-country skiing at the Winter Olympics